XHMAB-FM/XEMAB-AM is a radio station in Ciudad del Carmen, Campeche, Mexico. Broadcasting on 101.3 FM and 950 AM, XHMAB is owned by Radiorama and operated by Organización Radio Carmen and carries a FM Globo format from MVS Radio.

History
XEMAB-AM 950 was licensed to Mario Antonio Boeta Blanco in 1973 for operation with 250 watts of power and migrated to FM with an authorization in 2010. Boeta Blanco was mayor of Ciudad del Carmen from 1974 to 1976 and also had helped establish XEIT-AM, the first radio station in Carmen, in the 1960s.

In May 2017, XHMAB dropped its La Poderosa Regional Mexican format for Retro.

In August 2020, XHMAB changed its format to El Heraldo Radio. All Retro shows, including Centro Regional de Noticias, were moved to XHPMEN-FM, a new station being leased by Radiorama.

On March 1, 2022, the programming of El Heraldo Radio concluded, and announced the MVS Radio's FM Globo romantic format on June 28 part of new operator Organización Radio Carmen.

References

Radio stations in Campeche
Radio stations in Mexico with continuity obligations
Radio stations established in 1980